Princess Turandot may refer to:

The main character in Turandot, a play by Carlo Gozzi written in 1762
Princess Turandot, a 1922 play staged by Russian-Armenian theatre director Yevgeny Vakhtangov
Prinzessin Turandot, a 1934 German film known as Princess Turandot in English
Turandot, Princess of China, 1935 French version of the German film
Princess Turandot, a 2000 play written and produced by American theatre director Darko Tresnjak

See also
 Turandot (disambiguation)